Miz Ima Starr is a New Zealand/American singing drag cabaret performer of stage and small screen. She is the comic creation of Charles Bracewell, best known for her appearances on reality TV show Australia's Got Talent. Bracewell produced and/or directed six films and one documentary television series, most notably the short film Siren starring Craig Hall (actor) and Dean O'Gorman. The film screened at forty film festivals worldwide and was described by ImageOut as being "A beautifully shot piece on the process of grief, this film deftly explores the conflicted emotions of a young soldier whose mysterious encounter with a siren allows him to come to terms with the loss of his best friend (and lover) in battle". He co-hosted In The Pink, the first GLBTIQ show on an FM station in New Zealand, with Rick Huntington on Auckland's 95bFM Radio from 1991 to 1998.

Miz Ima Starr cabaret shows include: 
If Life Gives You Lemons at Festival of Voices and TasPride Festival; 
My Heart's A Drummer at Hobart Spiegeltent;
You Asked For It! at the Feast Festival and Adelaide Fringe;
Gender (Off)ender at the Sydney Opera House;
Bassey Your Ass Off at the Adelaide Cabaret Festival;
Welcome to Wherthehellawee! at Adelaide Fringe; 
Up The Disco at the Adelaide Cabaret Festival;
Hello Miz American Pie at Festival of Voices, Aroha Festival and the Melbourne Comedy Festival - where the show was reviewed as "an expert blend of song and soliloquy retracing her fictional showbiz history".

Miz Ima Starr albums include My Heart's A Drummer and American Pie. Her duet with Baitercell of Trippin' (Push Push song) was originally recorded to promote the 95bFM float at the 1998 Hero Parade and was included on the soundtrack to the film I'll Make You Happy released by Flying Nun Records.

References

Cabaret
New Zealand comedians
Australian comedians
New Zealand drag queens
Living people
Year of birth missing (living people)